Dragana Zarić-Martinov(Serbian Cyrillic: Драгана Зарић-Мартинов, born 1 August 1977) is a Serbian former professional tennis player.

Her career-high rankings are No. 157 in singles, achieved in the spring of 2001, and No. 82 in doubles, reached summer 2002. She won four titles in singles and 24 in doubles at tournaments of the ITF Women's Circuit. She also played for the Yugoslavia Fed Cup team, from 1995 until 2005.

Zarić started her professional career in 1994, and in 1995, she won her first ITF title in Nicosia, Cyprus. In 1998, she played her first WTA Tour qualifying draws in Maria Lankowitz and Istanbul, but lost. She kicked off the 2001 season with attempts to qualify on a couple of WTA and all Grand Slam tournaments, but failed to pass the qualifying rounds. In doubles, the same year, she got to the finals of the Budapest Grand Prix and the quarterfinals at the Wimbledon Championships.

Zarić retired from pro tennis 2006.

WTA career finals

Doubles: 1 (runner-up)

ITF Circuit finals

Singles: 13 (4–9)

Doubles: 40 (24–16)

External links
 
 
 

1977 births
Living people
People from Vršac
Serbian female tennis players
Serbia and Montenegro female tennis players
Yugoslav female tennis players